Lindsay Anne Shookus (born June 18, 1980) is an American television producer. She has been nominated for 10 Emmy Awards, winning four times, for her work on Saturday Night Live.

Early life
Shookus's father, Robert, owned a manufacturers representative business while her mother, Christine, worked as a pharmaceutical sales representative. She has one older brother, Jeff, and one younger sister, Sara. She was raised in Williamsville, New York, and attended Williamsville South High School, where she was president of her junior and senior high school classes. She studied journalism at University of North Carolina at Chapel Hill from 1998 to 2002.

Career
After graduating from college in 2002, Shookus was hired as Marci Klein's assistant on Saturday Night Live. In 2008, she became an associate producer on the show and also had producing credits on 45 episodes of 30 Rock between 2008 and 2010. She was named an SNL co-producer in 2010, and was named as a producer in 2012. She is head of the show's talent department, booking hosts and musical guests, as well as scouting potential cast members. She was named one of Billboards 50 Most Powerful Music Executives in both 2015 and 2016. After 20 years at SNL, Shookus left the show in 2022.

Shookus and friend Kristin O’Keeffe Merrick host an annual “Women Work Fucking Hard” networking event in New York, which spotlights female entrepreneurs and encourages women to help each other succeed in business.

Personal life
Shookus met television producer Kevin Miller in 2002 and they married in 2010. Their daughter, Madeline, was born in early 2013. The couple separated in 2014 and later divorced. She dated Ben Affleck from 2017 to 2018, and again in early 2019.

During the 2016 presidential campaign, Shookus supported Hillary Clinton and was a member of the Emily's List Creative Council.

References

External links
 

1980 births
Television producers from New York (state)
Living people
People from Williamsville, New York
UNC Hussman School of Journalism and Media alumni
American women television producers
21st-century American women
Primetime Emmy Award winners